Susan Kellermann is an American actress.

Education 
Kellermann graduated from Randolph College with a Bachelor of Arts degree in English literature. She also studied acting at the Neighborhood Playhouse School of the Theatre with Sanford Meisner.

Career 
She made her television debut in episodes of Starsky and Hutch (1975) and Laverne & Shirley (1976). She went on to appear in many films, including Beetlejuice (1988), Elvira, Mistress of The Dark (1988), Death Becomes Her (1992) Last Holiday (2006), and Sweet, Sweet Lonely Girl (2016). She also appeared in three episodes of Taxi as Greta Gravas, mother of the character Latka (although in real life, she was only four years older than Kaufman). 

She made her Broadway debut in 1979 in the play Last Licks for which she received a Theatre World Award.

Filmography

Film

Television

References

External links
 
 

American film actresses
Living people
American television actresses
American stage actresses
21st-century American women
Year of birth missing (living people)